The 2016 Open d'Orléans was a professional tennis tournament played on indoor hard courts. It was the twelfth edition of the tournament which was part of the 2016 ATP Challenger Tour. It took place in Orléans, France between 26 September and 2 October 2016.

Singles main-draw entrants

Seeds

 1 Rankings are as of September 19, 2016.

Other entrants
The following players received wildcards into the singles main draw:
  Julien Benneteau
  Geoffrey Blancaneaux
  Tommy Robredo
  Alexandre Sidorenko

The following player received entry as a special exempt into the singles main draw:
  Norbert Gombos

The following players received entry with a protected ranking into the singles main draw:
  Jerzy Janowicz
  Jürgen Melzer

The following players received entry from the qualifying draw:
  Antoine Hoang
  Nikola Mektić
  Hugo Nys
  Ante Pavić

The following player received entry as a lucky loser:
  Andrey Rublev

Champions

Singles

 Pierre-Hugues Herbert def.   Norbert Gombos, 7–5, 4–6, 6–3.

Doubles

 Nikola Mektić /  Franko Škugor def.  Ariel Behar /  Andrei Vasilevski, 6–2, 7–5.

External links
Official Website